You Nazty Spy! is a 1940 comedy film directed by Jules White and starring American slapstick comedy team The Three Stooges (Moe Howard, Larry Fine, and Curly Howard). It is the 44th short film released by Columbia Pictures starring the comedians, who released 190 short films for the studio between 1934 and 1959.

Plot
The short begins with a title card disclaimer that reads: "Any resemblance between the characters in this picture and any persons, living or dead, is a miracle."

In the fictional country of Moronika, three munitions manufacturers — Messrs. Ixnay (Richard Fiske), Onay (Dick Curtis), and Amscray (Don Beddoe) — are upset over their lack of profits due to the country's king, Herman the Sixth and Seven-Eighths (the role is an allusion to the German Kaiser Wilhelm II in exile), pursuing a policy of peace instead of war. They decide to oust the king, implement a dictatorship, and go about finding someone stupid enough to be a figurehead leader. Ixnay volunteers the three wallpaper hangers simultaneously working in his dining room: The Stooges.

Ixnay, Onay, and Amscray meet with Moe Hailstone, Curly Gallstone, and Larry Pebble and tell them of their offer to run Moronika. Moe is instituted as the leader (the Adolf Hitler role), with Curly as Field Marshal "Gallstone" (representing Hermann Göring while also mimicking Benito Mussolini), and Larry as Minister of Propaganda Pebble (a representation of Joseph Goebbels). After his takeover, Hailstone proceeds to give a speech to the masses, cuing Larry to display signs reading "CHEERS", "APPLAUSE", and, accidentally, "HISS."

However, the daughter (Lorna Gray) of the overthrown king pays Hailstone a visit, going by the name Mattie Herring (a spoof of World War I spy Mata Hari). The Stooges eventually suspect her of being a spy and sentence her to execution, but she escapes.

Larry then saws the corners off of a square table to be ready for a round-table meeting. A ballerina enters and tells them the delegates have arrived for the meeting. In the said meeting, Moe tells the delegates that his country Moronika demands more land concessions from its neighbors, leading the delegates to start arguing with him. Curly manages to silence the delegates by knocking them out with golf balls, but after the meeting, a large mob led by the king and Mattie Herring advance on the palace. The trio quickly abdicates, only to inadvertently flee into a lion's den, and are chased and eaten offscreen.

The lions walk out, each one wearing either Pebble, Gallstone, or Hailstone's respective clothing, as one of them burps, concluding the film.

Significance
You Nazty Spy! satirized the Nazis and the Third Reich and helped publicize the Nazi threat in a period when the United States was still neutral about World War II and isolationist sentiment was prevalent among the public. During this period, isolationist senators such as Burton Wheeler and Gerald Nye objected to Hollywood films on grounds that they were anti-Nazi propaganda vehicles designed to mobilize the American public for war. According to the Internet Movie Database, You Nazty Spy! was the first Hollywood film to spoof Hitler.<ref>[https://www.imdb.com/title/tt0033281/trivia Internet Movie Database:  You Nazty Spy!" — Trivia.]</ref> It was released nine months before the Charlie Chaplin film The Great Dictator, which began filming in September 1939. You Nazty Spy! was filmed on December 5–9, 1939.

The Hays code discouraged or prohibited many types of political and satirical messages in feature films, requiring that the history and prominent people of other countries must be portrayed "fairly". Short films such as those released by the Stooges were subject to less attention than feature films.

Production notes
The title is a parody of comedian Joe Penner's catchphrase "You Nasty Man!" as well as the 1939 Warner Bros. film Confessions of a Nazi Spy.
Moe Howard, as "Moe Hailstone", became the first American actor to portray/imitate Adolf Hitler in a released film, although Chaplin's portrayal was shot before the Stooges' film went into production.
Both Moe Howard and Larry Fine cited You Nazty Spy! as their favorite Three Stooges short.You Nazty Spy! was followed by a sequel, I'll Never Heil Again, in 1941. Moronika would also be the setting for Dizzy Pilots (1943).
Larry uses the alias 'Moronica' while disguised as a woman in Higher Than a Kite (1943).
The parody of the Nazi banner with two snakes in the form of a swastika is captioned with the phrase "Moronika for Morons" which is a play on the Nazi slogan "Deutschland den Deutschen" (Germany for Germans).
The Stooges—all Ashkenazi Jews—occasionally worked a word or phrase of Yiddish into their dialogue. In particular here, the Stooges make several overt Jewish and Yiddish cultural references:
The exclamation "Beblach!" used several times in the film is a Yiddish word meaning "beans".
"Shalom aleichem!", literally "Peace unto you" is a standard Hebrew greeting meaning "hello, pleased to meet you".
In Moe's imitation of a Hitler speech, he says "in pupik gehabt haben" (the semi-obscene "I've had it in the bellybutton" in Yiddish). These references to the Nazi leadership and Hitler speaking Yiddish were particularly ironic inside jokes for the Yiddish-speaking Jewish audience.
In a gag when Moe tries to shush Larry and Curly at a table with Mattie Herring, the boys make train noises until a conductor appears and says, "All out for Syracuse!" When Larry leaves and Mattie Herring asks where he is going, Moe replies, "The boy's from Syracuse" — a reference to the musical The Boys from Syracuse (1938).
A colorized version of this film was released in 2004. It was part of the DVD collection entitled Stooged & Confoosed.You Nazty Spy was also the first Stooges short to bear a new opening title sequence, with the Columbia logo's torch-bearing woman on the left-hand corner, standing on a pedestal where each step has printed out "Columbia," "Short Subject" and "Presentation," and the opening titles and credits are inside a box with rounded edges. This format will remain in effect through Booby Dupes.
 When asked why they have no lions, Curly replies "Because there are no bones in ice cream." This bizarre and otherwise unexplained non-sequitur is a colloquialism of the period that would be offered as a non-sensical answer to a non-sensical question.
 Two of the lions at the end of the film are known as former MGM lions, "Tanner and Jackie", both of whom had previously appeared in Three Missing Links, Wee Wee Monsieur, and Movie Maniacs''. The name of the third lion is unknown.

References

External links
 
 
You Nazty Spy! at threestooges.net
Moe, Larry and Curly: Premature Anti-Fascists

American satirical films
American political satire films
The Three Stooges films
1940 films
Cultural depictions of Adolf Hitler
Cultural depictions of Benito Mussolini
Cultural depictions of Joseph Goebbels
Cultural depictions of Hermann Göring
American black-and-white films
Films directed by Jules White
Films set in Europe
Films set in a fictional country
1940 comedy films
American World War II propaganda shorts
Columbia Pictures short films
Films with screenplays by Felix Adler (screenwriter)
American slapstick comedy films
1940s English-language films
1940s American films